This is a list of electoral results for the electoral district of Archerfield in Queensland state elections.

Members for Archerfield

Election results

Elections in the 1990s

Elections in the 1980s

Elections in the 1970s

References

Queensland state electoral results by district